Harita is a genus of moths of the family Erebidae. The genus was erected by Frederic Moore in 1882.

Species
Harita belinda (Butler, 1879) Japan
Harita brachyphylla (Turner, 1903) Queensland
Harita irregularis Holloway, 1979 New Caledonia
Harita nebulosa  Moore, 1881) Darjeeling
Harita nodyna (Bethune-Baker, 1908) New Guinea
Harita rectilinea Moore, 1882 Khasi Hills, Sri Lanka, Myanmar, Peninsular Malaysia, Sumatra, Borneo

References

Hypeninae
Moth genera